Jane L. Grogan (born 8 July 1966) is an Australian-born, US-based scientist specializing in immunology and cancer research.

Research 
Grogan's cancer research focuses on mechanisms of T cell activation, tolerance-induction and epigenetic modifiers, using integrative approaches, combining bioinformatics, biology and diagnostics. Most significantly at Genentech, Grogan and her lab identified key regulators of effector and regulatory T cells and moved targets into clinical development for autoimmune and oncology indications including anti-lymphotoxin in rheumatoid arthritis and anti-TIGIT for cancer immunotherapy 

Immunotherapies that harness the activity of the immune system against tumors are proving to be an effective therapeutic approach in multiple malignancies. However, tumors can also suppress these responses by activating negative regulatory pathways and checkpoints. Blocking these checkpoints on T cells has provided dramatic clinical benefit, but only a subset of patients exhibit clear and durable responses, suggesting that other mechanisms must be limiting the immune response. Grogan and collaborators have identified that TIGIT, an inhibitory receptor expressed by lymphocytes, may play a role in limiting antitumor responses. TIGIT suppresses T cell activation by promoting the generation of mature immunoregulatory dendritic cells

Background 
Grogan was born in Geelong, Victoria, Australia. She completed her undergraduate degree in science at the University of Melbourne, Australia and a PhD in Immunology at Leiden University in The Netherlands. Her post-doctoral training was at the German Rheumatism Research Centre Berlin (DRFZ) in Berlin as an Alexander von Humboldt Fellow.

She then moved to the United States to take up a position as a Howard Hughes Fellow at the University of California, San Francisco before joining Genentech in 2004. She moved to ArsenalBio in September 2019.

Grogan is on the advisory board of the Sustainable Science Institute and presents a science journalism podcast produced by Genentech called Two Scientists Walk Into a Bar.

References

External links 
 

1966 births
Living people
Cancer researchers
Australian expatriates in the United States
Expatriate academics in the United States
Australian women scientists
Australian immunologists
Women immunologists
University of Melbourne alumni
Leiden University alumni
21st-century Australian scientists
21st-century women scientists
21st-century Australian businesswomen
21st-century Australian businesspeople
Australian women chief executives